Jung Ba-Ra (Hangul: 정바라, born June 13, 1989) is a South Korean short track speed skater.

External links
Profile from ISU official website

1989 births
Living people
South Korean female short track speed skaters
Universiade medalists in short track speed skating
Universiade gold medalists for South Korea
Universiade silver medalists for South Korea
Universiade bronze medalists for South Korea
Competitors at the 2009 Winter Universiade
Competitors at the 2011 Winter Universiade
21st-century South Korean women